is a 1950 Japanese film directed by Tsutomu Sawamura.

Cast
 Setsuko Hara
 Hajime Izu (伊豆肇)
 Kuniko Miyake (三宅邦子)
 Sakae Ozawa (小沢栄)

See also
 There is a different film with similar name: Alps Story: My Annette (アルプス物語　わたしのアンネット, Arupusu Monogatari Watashi no Annetto), 1983 anime television series.

References

Japanese black-and-white films
1950 films
Films directed by Tsutomu Sawamura
1950s Japanese films